The Pilo Family Circus is a 2006 horror novel by Will Elliott.

Plot

It follows the story of Jamie, who, after a random incident of nearly hitting a clown with his car, finds himself being stalked by three sadistic clowns.

Background
The Pilo Family Circus was first published in Australia in October 2006 by ABC Books in trade paperback format after winning the inaugural ABC Fiction Award. It has also been released in an audio edition by ABC Audio, in 2007 it was released in the United Kingdom, Germany and Italy, Sweden, Spain, Russia, and in 2009 it was released in the United States. The Pilo Family Circus won the 2006 Aurealis Award for best horror novel and the Golden Aurealis Award for best novel. It also won 2007 Ditmar Award for best novel, the 2006 Australian Shadows Award, the Sydney Morning Herald's "Best Young Novelist Award" for 2007 and was a short-list nominee for the 2007 International Horror Guild Award for best novel. In 2011, the Spanish edition won the Nocte award for Best International Book. A stage play based on the book was performed in 2012 by the Godlight Theater Company.

References

External links

2006 Australian novels
Aurealis Award-winning works
Australian horror novels
Novels about clowns
Works about stalking